Rupam Bhuyan (born 6 March 1980) is an Indian playback singer from Assam. He is the frontman of the Indian fusion band North East Breeze. He is the lead vocalist of the band Tunetellers. He sang in numerous Assamese films including Khobh, Anuradha,Mumtaz ,Akash Chuboloi Mon, Majrati Keteki, Rough and Tough (2018), Krodh(2018), Kokaideu Bindass(2018), KonwarPurar Konwar, TRP, Sringkhal, Mahasamar,Raf and Taf, Surya , Anur, The Government Servent etc. He won Prag Cine Awards-2013 and Prag Cine Awards-2017 in the Best Playback Singer (male) category for the films Mumtaz and Majrati Keteki.He won the Best Male Playback Singer of Assam category for Ramdhenu Viewers choice award 2013 for the song Hahikhini jodi. He won best singer award in film category for the song ' Akakh Xonowali ' from Majrati Keteki in Gupshup Music Awards 2017. 'Jhumuri' the song by 'North East Breeze' received song of the year award in 'Pride East Awards' and 'Gup Shup Music Awards' in 2018. He composed the theme song for the Jeevan Kite and River Festival-2015 as a tribute to the river Brahmaputra.

Filmography

Discography
Rumanthan, 2007
Rupamor Porox (2009)
Chaan Poharar Khela (2013)
Bisari Aant (2016)
Saya-Sobi, Chapter-1 (2022)
Anuron (2016) featuring Queen Hazarika, Jim Ankan Deka

North East Breeze Production
Dhwani (2010)
Reflection (2011)
 Groove (2013) by NortheastBreeze
 Echoes (2015)

Other Production
Andhare-Junake, 2017
Xuvakamana, 2009

Bangla Production
Kisu Gan Kisu Abexh, 2017
Manush Khuje Berai, 2019

Award
North East Idol, 2006
xu-Xandhan, 2007
Prag Chine Award, 2013
Ramdhenu Viewer's Choice Awards, 2013
Young Achievers Awards, Ghy Rotari Club, 2014
Rodali Awards, 2014
Young Achiever Awards, WWE MUMBAI, 2015
Prag Chine Award, 2017
Gop-Sop Music Awards, 2018
Biju Phukan Awards, 2018

References

External links 

1980 births
Living people
Assamese playback singers
Indian male playback singers
Musicians from Guwahati
Singers from Assam
Indian male singer-songwriters
Indian singer-songwriters